Norwaco is a union for rights holders in audiovisual works in Norway.

The organization administrates copyrighted works used by broadcasters. It was established in 1983.

List of member bodies
This is a list of member bodies:

Norwegian Specialized Press Association
Norwegian Authors' Union
Norwegian Publishers' Association
Association for Norwegian Independent Record Companies
Norwegian Association of Fine Arts Photographers
Norwegian Organisation for Visual Communication
Recording Artists Association
IFPI Norway
Norwegian Musicians' Union
Norwegian Audiovisual Translators Association
Norwegian Society of Composers and Lyricists
Norwegian Association of Professional Photographers
Norwegian Artists and Songwriters Association
Norwegian Non-Fiction Writers' and Translators’ Association
Norwegian Film Workers' Association
Norwegian Union of Journalists
Norwegian Society of Composers
Norwegian Critics' Association
Norwegian Music Publishers' Association
Norwegian Association of Literary Translators
Association of Norwegian Editors
Norwegian Comedy Writers' Association
Norwegian Union for Stage Directors
Norwegian Actors' Equity Association
National Federation of Norwegian Musical Soloists
Norwegian Writers for Children
Association of Norwegian Visual Artists
Norwegian Ballet Union
Writers' Guild of Norway
Norwegian Film and TV Producers’ Association
Directors Guild of Norway
Norwegian Stage Designers Association
New Music Composers' Group
TONO

References

 
Organisations based in Oslo
Organizations established in 1983
Cultural organisations based in Norway